Krypton is a fictional planet appearing in American comic books published by DC Comics, most commonly appearing or mentioning in stories starring the superhero Superman as the world he came from. The planet was created by Jerry Siegel and Joe Shuster, and was named after the chemical element krypton. The planet was first mentioned in Action Comics #1 (June 1938) and made its first appearance in Superman #1 (1939).

Krypton is also the native world of Supergirl, Krypto the Superdog, Beppo the Super-Monkey, Power Girl (in her case, an alternate-universe version designated "Krypton-Two"), and the supervillain General Zod. It has been consistently described as having been destroyed shortly after Superman's escape from the planet, although the exact details of its destruction vary by time period and writers. Kryptonians were the dominant species on Krypton.

Krypton also makes an appearance in several television series such as Adventures of Superman, Lois & Clark: The New Adventures of Superman, Superman: The Animated Series, Smallville, Supergirl, and Krypton. Krypton appears in the 1978 film Superman, the 2006 film Superman Returns, and the 2013 film Man of Steel, set in the DC Extended Universe.

Overview
Krypton is usually portrayed in comics as the home of a fantastically advanced civilization, which is destroyed when the planet explodes. As originally depicted, all the civilizations and races of Krypton perished in the explosion, with one exception: the baby Kal-El who was placed in an escape rocket by his father, Jor-El, and sent to the planet Earth, where he grew up to become Superman.

In some versions of the story, additional survivors were later discovered, such as Supergirl, her parents (kept alive in the "Survival Zone", a similar parallel "dimension" to the Phantom Zone), the criminal inhabitants of the Phantom Zone, Dev-Em, the residents of the bottled city of Kandor, the real parents of both Superman and Supergirl, and their pets Krypto the Superdog, and Beppo the Super-Monkey. Kandor, the first capital of Krypton, is miniaturized by Brainiac, but is eventually recovered by Superman and subsequently housed in the Fortress of Solitude for safekeeping. Soon afterward, Kryptonopolis becomes the second capital of Krypton.

From the late 1980s through the early 2000s, the number of survivors was reduced to Superman himself in the comic book stories (the Eradicator was added in 1989 as a non-sentient device, and shown to be self-aware in 1991), but more recent accounts have restored Supergirl, Krypto, and Kandor and introduced another newly discovered survivor, Karsta Wor-Ul.

Kryptonian civilization's reported level of technological advancement has also varied. Some works, such as Kevin J. Anderson's novel The Last Days of Krypton, describe it as a few centuries ahead of Earth, while others, such as the Superman film series and Man of Steel, describe it as thousands or even hundreds of thousands of years more advanced.

Versions of Krypton

Krypton in the Golden Age of Comic Books

History

In its first appearance, Krypton was only depicted at the moment of its destruction. Soon, beginning in the Superman comic strip, Krypton was shown to have been a planet similar to Earth, only older by eons and possessed of all the beneficial progress that implied (though the downside was the hint that Krypton exploded due mainly to old age).

The debut of the Superman newspaper comic strip in 1939 delved into further details about Krypton, introducing the idea that all Kryptonians possessed a level of heightened physical abilities, including super-strength and super-speed. In the early comics' version of Krypton, Superman's parents were named "Jor-L" and "Lora" (changed to the more familiar "Jor-El" and "Lara" by the end of the 1940s).

The Golden Age Krypton would be revised into another form almost as soon as it was defined, and very few stories were initially written about it. However, after the introduction of DC's multiverse in the 1960s, this version of Krypton was declared to be the Krypton of the Earth-Two universe (the native dimension of DC's Golden Age characters) and its Superman.

After the emergence of Earth-Two as a differentiated alternate universe within the DC Multiverse, Power Girl (Kara Zor-L) was introduced as Krypton-Two's alternate Supergirl in 1976. Kal-L and Kara Zor-L were the only known survivors of Krypton-Two, unlike the Silver Age analogue. Earth-Two's universe lacked its own Brainiac, so its Kandor was never abducted from Krypton Two before its destruction, nor did Kal-L have his own version of Krypto as an infant and toddler on this world.

In the Golden Age, Superman was unaware initially of his true origins; in Superman #61, Superman discovered the existence of Krypton for the first time and learned of his Kryptonian heritage. He later encountered other survivors prior to Kara's arrival in the form of three criminals, U-Ban, Kizo, and Mala, who were exiled by Superman's father before Krypton's destruction.

Krypton in transition
Over the course of the 1940s and 1950s, various alterations and additions to the makeup of Krypton were made in the comics. Among them was an explanation of why the natives of Krypton perished if they had possessed superpowers on their native world (as was the case in the earliest versions of Krypton outlined above, although this only became a problem once Superman — and by extension anyone from Krypton — was portrayed as increasingly powerful, able to withstand nuclear explosions, contrasted with his original power level in which a bursting mortar shell could penetrate his skin).

Thus, it was explained by the early 1950s that Kryptonians were powerless on their own planet and would gain superpowers only within a lower gravity environment. This matched the correct theories being published that when man reaches the Moon (a lighter gravity environment) he will be able to lift great masses and leap great distances. In the early 1960s, added to this was the need to be exposed to the rays of a yellow sun (versus Krypton's red sun, Rao, which was older and cooler, or put out less energy) to gain superpowers, with the yellow sun aspect soon gaining the much greater emphasis. Other changes to the concept of Krypton and its culture were introduced, many of which were stylistic.

Krypton in the Silver Age of Comic Books
By the late 1950s, Krypton played an increasing role in various Superman stories, with greater detail provided about Krypton's makeup. Superman's Kryptonian heritage was a frequent factor in Silver Age Superman comic storylines, as he was fully aware of his origins from an early age. Superman would use this knowledge for such tasks as constructing advanced Kryptonian technology or observing some of Krypton's traditions.

History

Kryptonians made use of their advanced science to create a world where scientific inventions and research influenced much of daily life. Robots and computers were used for many tasks on Krypton, even for determining what career paths young Kryptonians would take as they grew up. Scientific and technological research were highly valued on Krypton, with the ruling body of Krypton named the "Science Council".

Several stories featured characters traveling back in time to visit Krypton before its destruction; one example is the 1960 story "Superman's Return to Krypton", in which Superman is swept back in time to Krypton some years before its destruction. Powerless, he spends some time on the planet, where he meets his future parents-to-be and falls in love with a Kryptonian actress named Lyla Lerrol. A Superman "imaginary story" entitled "What If Krypton Had Not Exploded?" (reprinted in the trade paperback The Greatest Superman Stories Ever Told) gave more insight into Krypton's society. This era also established that the Guardians of the Universe, the administrators of the interstellar police force, the Green Lantern Corps, were themselves aware of Krypton's pending destruction and assigned Green Lantern Tomar-Re to avert it, but he was ultimately unsuccessful in his attempt.

In 1980, a three-issue miniseries titled World of Krypton was published, providing a great amount of detail into Krypton's history just before its destruction, along with the life story of Jor-El himself. A three-issue miniseries entitled The Krypton Chronicles, published in 1981, tells of Superman researching his roots when, as Clark Kent, he was assigned to write an article about Superman's family by an assignment editor impressed with the television miniseries Roots. To do so, he and Supergirl travel to Kandor, where they learn the history of the El family. In 1985, writer Alan Moore gave a somewhat darker glimpse into the world of Krypton in his story "For the Man Who Has Everything" (in Superman Annual #11), the premise being an elaborate dream of Superman's in which Krypton had not exploded and he had grown to adulthood there. Background details are culled from other Krypton stories. This same story was retold in the animated series Justice League Unlimited in an episode by the same name and several elements were used in the Supergirl series episode "For the Girl Who Has Everything". The story was also an inspiration for Krypton episode "Mercy".

Flora and fauna
Krypton has a vast number of flora and fauna, both wild and domesticated. Some of them look very similar to Earth's animals, due to parallel evolution, e.g., birds, felids, canids, simians, etc., as seen in Krypto and Beppo; while others look very different, due to divergent evolution, e.g., fish/snake/eel-like hybrid creatures called "fish-snakes", goat-like creatures called "Zuurt", bovine-like creatures called "Rondor", rhino/ceratopsian-like hybrid creatures called "Thought-Beasts", dragon-like creatures called "H'Raka", gigantic, one-horned snake-like creatures called "Drang", and jellyfish-like invertebrate creatures called "Shoggoth".

Moons
One of Krypton's moons, Wegthor, was accidentally destroyed by the Kryptonian scientist Jax-Ur, who was experimenting with a nuclear missile that was diverted from its intended destination. The disaster killed 500 inhabitants of the moon and Jax-Ur became the first and only criminal to be banished eternally to the Phantom Zone. This disaster also prompted the Science Council of Krypton to ban space flight completely.

Survivors
A Silver Age Superman was not alone in the survival of Krypton's destruction, being joined by his cousin Supergirl, the Phantom Zone criminals, Krypto the Superdog, Beppo the Super-Monkey, a juvenile delinquent named Dev-Em, the entire population of the city of Kandor, Supergirl's biological parents, and even Superman's biological parents (in hibernation on a space ship - Superboy #158 (July 1969)), although it was discovered that they actually died from lethal radiation. When the planet exploded, one entire city of Krypton, Argo City, survived the cataclysm.

Argo City drifted through space on an asteroid-sized fragment of Krypton, which had been transformed into kryptonite by the explosion. The super-advanced technology of its Kryptonian inhabitants allowed them to construct a life-sustaining dome and a lead shield that protected their city from the kryptonite radiation of the asteroid. The protective shield was destroyed in a meteor storm, exposing the inhabitants to the deadly radiation.

The sole survivor of Argo City, Kara Zor-El, was sent to Earth by her scientist father to live with her cousin Kal-El, who had become known as Superman. Kara adjusted to her new life on Earth and became known as Supergirl. It was later discovered that Supergirl's parents had survived in the Survival Zone, a parallel dimension similar to the Phantom Zone, from which she released them. When the bottle city of Kandor was finally enlarged on a new planet that was similar to Krypton, Supergirl's parents joined its inhabitants to live there.

Daxamites

The people now known as the Daxamites were originally Kryptonians who left their homeworld to explore the universe (in post-Crisis on Infinite Earths continuity, the Eradicator, an artificial lifeform programmed to preserve all Kryptonian culture, altered the birthing matrices ("artificial wombs") that the explorers took with them so that all newborns would be fatally vulnerable to lead and other materials such as greenhouse gases and certain rocks). Thus, if they persisted in their anti-Kryptonian wanderlust, they would all die from it. One Daxamite, Mon-El, was poisoned by lead and preserved in the Phantom Zone until a cure was found by Brainiac 5 in the 30th century, whereafter Mon-El became a member of the Legion of Super-Heroes.

Crisis on Infinite Earths
After the 1985 miniseries Crisis on Infinite Earths, the Silver Age version of Krypton was replaced by a newer version. The Silver Age Krypton made a rare Post-Crisis appearance in The Sandman #48, during a flashback sequence.

Krypton in the Modern Age of Comic Books

The Man of Steel
Following Crisis on Infinite Earths, which rebooted the history of the DC Universe and retroactively eliminated the existence of the Golden and Silver Age versions of Krypton, writer/artist John Byrne was given the task of recreating the entire Superman mythos. This rewrite was started in the 1986 Man of Steel miniseries, which addressed Krypton in both its opening and closing chapters.

Krypton itself was the main subject of the late 1980s The World of Krypton miniseries (not to be confused with the 1979 miniseries of the same name). This miniseries was written by Byrne and illustrated by Mike Mignola, and filled in much of Krypton's new history.

History
The new Krypton was approximately one-and-a-half times larger than the Earth and orbited a red sun called Rao fifty light-years from the Solar System. Krypton's primordial era produced some of the most dangerous organisms in the universe. It was for this reason that 250,000 years ago, Krypton was chosen as the place to create Doomsday through forced evolution. Until its destruction, many dangerous animals, including ferrophage moles, still existed on Krypton. Kryptonians had to use their advanced technology to survive.

Over 200,000 years ago, Krypton had developed scientific advancements far beyond those of present-day Earth, and had discovered a way to conquer disease and aging by perfecting cloning; vast banks of clones, kept in stasis, held multiple copies of each living Kryptonian so that replacement parts were always available in the event of injury. All Kryptonians were now effectively immortal, "with all the strength and vigor of youth maintained", and for millennia they enjoyed an idyllic, sensual existence in an Arcadian paradise.

100,000 years later Kryptonian society was tipping toward decadence and eventually political strife resulted from the debate about the use of clones (three by each Kryptonian; one child, one teen and one adult, perfectly preserved in stasis in large clone banks) to repair any hurt and avoiding death, if they were sentient beings and should have rights to be awakened to live as any other Kryptonian, sparked in addition by the presence of an alien missionary known as the Cleric, who carried "the Eradicator". Eventually this disagreement led to open violent conflict. A woman named Nyra, seeking what she considered a suitable mate for her son, Kan-Z, had one of her younger clones removed from stasis. The clone gained full sentience and was presented to society as a normal woman. When Kan-Z discovered that his fiancée was in fact his mother's clone, he killed the clone, then publicly killed his mother and also attempted his own suicide before being stopped. Kan-Z also publicly broadcast the entirety of his discovered findings as to what his mother had done across the entire planet. This key incident ignited the Clone Wars which lasted for 1,000 years, during which Kryptonian science was turned to warfare and several superweapons were developed and used. Among them was the device known as the Destroyer.

Although the Eradicator's effects (altering the DNA of all Kryptonian lifeforms so that they would instantly die upon leaving the planet) were felt immediately, the Destroyer's effects were possibly more significant: by the time the Kryptonian government admitted defeat and abolished the clone banks, a pro-clone rights terrorist faction known as Black Zero had started the Destroyer (activated by Kan-Z himself), a device which functioned as a giant atomic energy gun, projecting massive streams of nuclear energy into the core of Krypton, intended to trigger an explosive chain reaction within Krypton's core almost immediately.

The destruction (by Van-L, an ancestor of Jor-El) of the Destroyer eliminated the Post-Crisis city of Kandor in a fiery nuclear explosion, but it was believed at the time that the device had been stopped before it could achieve planetary destruction. Centuries later, Jor-El himself would discover that the reaction had only been slowed to a nearly imperceptible rate and it would eventually destroy the planet as intended.

Destruction
Though it survived the war, Krypton was scarred deeply by it. The formerly lush garden world was burned and blasted to a desert, and a sterile society—emotionally unlike its predecessor—emerged. The population lived isolated from one another in widely separated technological citadels, shunning all physical and personal contact, to the point that even family members would only interact with each other via communication devices. Procreation became a matter of selecting compatible genetic material to be placed within an artificial womb called a "birthing matrix"; the parents almost never met in person and never touched one another. The planetary government was deeply isolationist and forbade space exploration and communication with other worlds.

The young scientist Jor-El was born into this world. By his adult years, a mysterious "Green Plague" was killing Kryptonians by the thousands, and upon researching the matter, Jor-El discovered that its cause was growing radiation produced by Krypton's increasingly unstable core. This process was going to cause the planet to explode.

Unable to convince his associates to abandon tradition and consider escape, and reasoning that modern Kryptonian society had grown cold, unfeeling and sterile, Jor-El removed the Eradicator's planetary binding genes from his unborn son Kal-El's genetic pattern, took Kal-El's birthing matrix and attached a prototype interstellar propulsion system to the vessel. Just as the planet began to shake apart and massive, exploding streams of green energy erupted through the surface of Krypton, Jor-El launched the matrix towards Earth, where it would open and give birth to the infant upon landing (the Post-Crisis Superman therefore was considered to be technically "born" on Earth). Jor-El was not only determined that his son would survive the death of his birthworld, but that he would grow up on a world that vibrantly embraced living, as his forebears once did.

The Last Son of Krypton
A central theme of this version of the Superman mythos was that the character was to remain the last surviving remnant of Krypton. Thus, Silver Age elements such as Supergirl, Krypto, Beppo, and Kandor had never existed in this version (though Post-Crisis versions of these elements were eventually reintroduced).

The supervillain Doomsday was revealed in the 1990s as a being genetically engineered by Bertron, an alien scientist, on an ancient Krypton. Doomsday left the planet after killing Bertron and Krypton's natives found the remains of Bertron's lab, thus obtaining the knowledge of cloning.

In the newer continuity, Superman also became aware of his alien heritage only sometime after his debut as a superhero - initially assuming himself to be a human mutated in some manner and launched as part of an Earth space program - when a holographic program encoded into the craft which brought him to Earth uploaded the information into his brain (although Lex Luthor had earlier discovered his alien heritage when his attempts to create a clone of Superman were complicated by the unexpected x-factor of Superman's alien DNA).

Revisiting Krypton
In Action Comics #600 (May 1988), Krypton was close enough to Earth that the radiation from its explosion (traveling only at light speed) was able to reach Earth.

In a 1988 storyline, Superman traveled to the former site of Krypton to discover that the planet was slowly reforming from the vast sphere of debris remaining. It would take millions of years before the planet would be solid again. This sphere of debris had been turned to kryptonite by the planet's destruction, and the radiation caused Superman to have a hallucination in which the entire population of Krypton came to Earth and colonized the already inhabited planet, prompting Jor-El to initiate a Terran-based resistance movement, pitting him against his estranged wife Lara and now-grown son Kal-El, at which point the hallucination ended.

In Superman: The Man of Steel Annual #3, "Unforgiven" - an Elseworlds tale - Jor-El convinces the Science Council to relocate selected Kryptonians to Earth.

In a 1999 Starman storyline, Jack Knight became lost in time and space, and landed on Krypton several years before its destruction, meeting Jor-El as a young man. The story implies that it was this early meeting with a Terran that led Jor-El to study other worlds and eventually choose Earth as the target for his son's spacecraft; at the story's end, Jack gives Jor-El a device with the coordinates and images of Earth.

In a 2001–2002 storyline, an artificial version of the Pre-Crisis Krypton was created in the Phantom Zone by Brainiac 13, a descendant of the original Brainiac who had traveled back in time to the present. This version of Krypton was based on Jor-El's favorite Kryptonian historical period.

Superman: Birthright
In the 2004 miniseries Superman: Birthright, a new retelling of Superman's origin and early years, Mark Waid located Krypton in the Andromeda Galaxy 2.5 million light-years away, and adopted elements from several previous versions of the planet. Although usually depicted as a red giant or red supergiant, in this story Rao is mentioned by Jor-El to be a red dwarf.

In previous comic versions, it was assumed the "S" shield on Superman's costume simply stood for "Superman"; in Birthright, Waid presented it as a Kryptonian symbol of hope; he borrowed and modified a concept from Superman: The Movie, wherein the "S" was the symbol of the House of El, Superman's ancestral family.

Post-Birthright revisions
Beginning with Infinite Crisis, writer Geoff Johns began laying subtle hints to a new origin for Superman. Last Son, a storyline co-written by Geoff Johns and Superman film director Richard Donner, further delves into this version of Krypton which reintroduces General Zod and the Phantom Zone criminals into mainstream continuity as well as the crystalline technology known as "Sunstones". With art by Adam Kubert, the design of Kryptonian society is distinct yet again from Birthright, incorporating elements of both Pre-Crisis on Infinite Earths continuity and Donner's work on the first two Christopher Reeve films, in particular the notion of Krypton's Council threatening Jor-El with harsh punishment where he was to make public his predictions of their planet's imminent doom. This variation of Krypton's past was again seen in flashbacks during Johns' Brainiac and New Krypton story arcs. The very different depictions of Kryptonian clothing in the Golden and Silver Age comics, in the Christopher Reeve films, and in John Byrne's The Man of Steel all appeared in Johns' Superman: Secret Origin (which superseded The Man of Steel and Superman: Birthright).

Multi-ethnic versions of Kryptonians that resemble Africans, Indigenous Australians, Pacific Islanders, Indigenous Americans, and Asians have also made appearances in the stories. Previously, "black" Kryptonians were mainly confined within the Kryptonian continent of Vathlo Island, but a 2011 storyline depicted Kryptonians resembling black and Asian humans who were more integrated into Kryptonian society than they were in the Silver and pre-Modern Age DC Universe.

The New 52
Following Grant Morrison's run on Action Comics during The New 52, Krypton is again a scientific and cultural utopia, and Kryptonians themselves are highly intelligent, even from infancy; Morrison describes Krypton as "the planet of your dreams. A scientific utopia. I wanted to explore Krypton as the world of super people. What would happen if they worked it all out, if they lived for 500 years with amazing technology?" Cody Walker elaborates on this, saying, "Kal-El is the next step in evolution physically, but he comes from a planet that is the next stage in evolution as well. If his strength makes him the Man of Steel, then the ideologies that rule his planet make Superman the Man of Tomorrow". In Action Comics #14 (January 2013 cover date, published November 7, 2012) astrophysicist Neil deGrasse Tyson appears as a character in the story. He determines that Krypton orbited the red dwarf LHS 2520 in the constellation Corvus 27.1 light-years from Earth. Tyson assisted DC Comics in selecting a real-life star that would be an appropriate parent star to Krypton. He picked Corvus, which is Latin for "crow", because Superman's high school mascot is a crow. In a 2012 round-table discussion, Tyson stated that he chose to use real science when finding Krypton's location. He explained that many artists may only use bits and pieces of science, allowing for greater latitude in their creativity, but, he said, he wanted to show that using real science, particularly astrophysics, allows for just as much creativity.

Known locations
 Bokos - it was nicknamed the Isle of Thieves.
 Lurvan - the largest continent on Krypton.
 Argo City - one of the largest cities on Krypton. In many continuities, it is portrayed as having survived Krypton's destruction due to a field created to protect the city. Supergirl and her family were from Argo City.
 Fire Falls - a natural geological location where lava flows down a cliff.
 Jewel Mountains - a mountain range on Krypton. This was the location that Jax-Ur traveled back in time to in order to create Jewel Kryptonite.
 Kandor - the capital city of Krypton. It was bottled by Brainiac.
 Fort Rozz - this was the military command center in Kandor.
 Plane of Wanan - a desolate location outside of Kandor.
 Kryptonopolis - the largest city on Krypton and home to Jor-El and Lara. Kal-El was born here.
 Urrika - Urrika is one of two continents found on Krypton.
 Erkol - a city-state that had been in a war with Xan City.
 Xan City - one of the oldest cities found on Krypton. It was destroyed in a long war with Erkol.
 Vathlo Island - an island continent. This location is where the black Kryptonians reside.
 Orvai - a lakeside city and the home of Quex-Ul.
 Surrus - a city in southern Continent, named after their singing Flowers Surrus (Superman #236, 1971).

In other media

Radio
The first non-comics version of Krypton was presented in the debut storyline of the 1940s Superman radio series. In the radio show, Krypton was part of the Solar System, a Counter-Earth sharing Earth's orbit but on the opposite side of the Sun, hidden from view of the Earth ("Krypton" derives from the Greek word for "hidden"). Some comics of the early 1950s suggested a similar theory, but in general the comics have depicted Krypton as being in a far-away star system.

Television

Live-action
 In the pilot episode of the 1950s television program Adventures of Superman, Jor-El, Krypton's leading scientist, tries to warn the ruling council of Krypton's demise. In this take on the story, Jor-El proposes transporting the entire Kryptonian population to Earth via a fleet of rockets. He is laughed at by the council, and the planet begins to break apart sooner than he expected anyway, leaving him only with a small test rocket, in which he and Lara place Kal-El and his red-and-blue blankets. The narrator characterizes Krypton as being "millions of miles" from Earth.
 The version of Krypton portrayed in Lois & Clark: The New Adventures of Superman was similar to the 1978 version in Superman: The Movie. At the end of the third season, it is revealed that a sizable colony survived the planet's destruction. From what was shown of the colony (called New Krypton), the society, despite the advanced technology, had numerous archaic elements, like hereditary rule, arranged marriage for nobles, and trial by combat being legal for nobility (although seldom practiced). Unlike many incarnations, New Krypton is not isolated from other races; it has starships, including a large vessel that serves as its palace, and Nor hires an assassin from another race to kill Kal-El.
 The television series Smallville presents a version of Krypton that mirrors the Superman: The Movie aesthetic but has more ties to Earth. It was a peaceful and advanced planet until civil war broke out, leading to its destruction in 1986 by General Zod and the renegade Zor-El after they used Brainiac to ignite Krypton's unstable core. Numerous Kryptonian artifacts come into play during the show. Such as the "Stones of Power" in season 4 (used to contain all information in the known 28 galaxies and become the Crystal of Knowledge to make the Fortress of Solitude), "The Orb" in season 8 (containing the DNA of fallen Kryptonian citizens/soldiers scanned and cloned by Jor-El), and its bible The Book of Rao (used to transport Kryptonians to "Heaven") during season 9. In season 2, more Kryptonian glyphs appear on Earth via the Kawatche Caves as there are prophecies discovered about a "Traveler" planted by Jor-El visiting Smallville.
 Krypton is featured in the TV shows set in the Arrowverse:
 The destruction of Krypton was featured in the 2015 pilot episode of Supergirl. Kara was sent to Earth to protect her then-infant cousin, Kal-El. Krypton exploded just seconds after her pod took off, sending it into the Phantom Zone. The episode "Hostile Takeover" revealed that the planet was destroyed due to over-mining its core. The third-season episode "Dark Side of the Moon" revealed that Argo City was preserved along with many of the inhabitants on an asteroid formed from Kryptonian debris.
 Krypton is mentioned throughout Superman & Lois.
 David S. Goyer developed a prequel TV series titled Krypton. The main characters are Seg-El, Adam Strange, Kem, Lyta-Zod, Val-El, Nyssa-Vex, Jayna-Zod and Dev-Em. This version of Krypton became unstable after Brainiac steals the city of Kandor in the original timeline, an event that forces Seg to stop with allies like Adam Strange from the future and even the future General Dru-Zod. This version also borrows some elements from the initial post-Crisis depiction, such as the reproduction of Kryptonians through artificial means in Genesis Chamber birthing facility. In the first season, 200 years before the birth of Kal-El, Krypton is ruled by a powerful religious figure known as Voice of Rao and the planet is divided in several guilds. Due to its decadent lifestyle of some Kryptonians, this causes a social inequality and those who are not in the guilds become Rankless. When Seg discovers that Voice of Rao is a puppet controlled by Brainiac, he forms a resistance movement of several friends and allies, including his son from the future, General Zod. After trapping Brainiac and Seg in the Phantom Zone, Zod takes power in Krypton, forcing all Rankless to become Sagitari soldiers and cutting some guilds, such as Religious and Lawmaker. In the second season, Seg returns to Krypton and gathers some of the surviving allies in order to stop Zod's murderous conquest. Zod also sends Sagitari and Doomsday weapon on the moon Wegthor to crush the rebels. After the moon is destroyed, Seg and almost all the rebels return to Krypton. When Seg and Lyta expose Zod's treachery, Zod tries to kill them, but is defeated and Sagitari forces are defeated by the resistance, ending a civil war on Krypton.

Animation
 Krypton was very briefly depicted in the first Fleischer Studios-produced Superman cartoon in the early 1940s as "a planet that burned like a green star in the distant heavens [and where] civilization was far advanced and it brought forth a race of Supermen whose mental and physical powers were developed to the absolute peak of human perfection", implying that all Kryptonians had Superman's abilities even on their own planet. The planet is seen only from a distance, just before its explosion.
 Depictions of Krypton on both The New Adventures of Superman and Super Friends; in one of the "lost episodes" of Super Friends season of 1983–1984), "The Krypton Syndrome" Jor-El says that Krypton will be enveloped by their sun and explode a short time later.
 In Superman: The Animated Series, "The Last Son of Krypton", Krypton's climate is shown to have both temperate and Arctic conditions. According to commentary on the DVD collection of the show's first season, part of Krypton's appearance was influenced by the artistic style of American comic book artist Jack Kirby.
 This version depicted Brainiac as responsible via inaction for the destruction of Krypton's people (though not the planet itself). Brainiac was the planet's essential A.I. system, responsible for maintaining Krypton's data stores and advising the ruling Kryptonian elders. After Jor-El delivered his findings to him, Brainiac discovered that Jor-El's theories were correct; the planet's core was destabilizing and it would explode after several weeks of intense seismic activity. Brainiac knew that if the Kryptonian elders learned of the immanent disaster, he would be tasked with formulating an evacuation plan. However, given the extremely little time Krypton had left, he believed that any personal evacuation was pointless, and it would leave himself with no time to escape. As a result, he lied to the elders that Jor-El was mistaken and that the quakes were the result of a polar shift that would soon abate, discrediting Jor-El and his theories. Shortly after, Brainiac secretly uploaded himself and all of Krypton's culture and knowledge onto a satellite, jettisoning him out of Krypton's orbit before the planet's destruction, while the rest of Kryptonian civilization (save for Jor-El and his family) remained unaware of the grave danger they were in until it was too late to evacuate.
 Krypton had a "sister planet" named Argo (named after Argo City), colonized by Kryptonians many centuries before the destruction of Krypton. Its people had a greater resistance to kryptonite under a yellow sun. On a journey into space, Superman found that the explosion of Krypton pushed the planet from its orbit away from its sun, causing the planet to gradually cool. Its people went into cryostasis to survive, but an accident left Supergirl the only survivor. The remains of Krypton settled into an asteroid belt of kryptonite.
 In the Legion of Super Heroes animated series, Krypton is shown in a flashback during the episode "Message in a Bottle". In this version, Jor-El actually found a way to save the planet with his creation, "the Messenger". The Messenger was kept in the city of Kandor; when the city was shrunken and stolen by Brainiac, the planet's destruction was assured. At the end of the episode, the Messenger is used to restore Krypton from its remains, and Kandor is restored to its full size so its people can begin life anew.
 Krypton appears as a final cameo in the 2019 animated series DC Super Hero Girls, episode "#DCSuperHeroBoys" (Part 1). In a flashback, Alura Zor-El tells Zod that Krypton is collapsing on itself. She uses a device to send Zod and his minions Ursa and Non to the Phantom Zone, then tells Kara that she is sending her to join her cousin Kal.

Film

Superman

In the first feature-length Superman film in 1978, a vastly less idyllic image of Krypton was presented. Whereas in the comics Krypton was colorful and bright, the film depicted the planet with stark bluish-white terrain of jagged frozen plateaus under heavy, dark skies. The planet was threatened by their sun turning into a supernova. Jor-El unsuccessfully attempted to persuade the council of elders to immediately evacuate the planet.

Kryptonians themselves were portrayed as coolly cerebral and morally enlightened, clad in stark white bodysuits emblazoned with each family's house symbol. The architecture featured halls of white crystal under crystalline arches. The crystalline motif was employed not only in the architecture, but in the landscape and technology as well, suggesting that the entire planet had been adapted and altered by Kryptonian influence. In 1948, Krypton was ultimately destroyed when its red sun began to collapse; the planet was pulled into the sun and steadily crushed, then exploded in the ensuing supernova. When Krypton was destroyed, fragments from the planet were launched into space, resulting in the creation of a harmful radioactive substance known as kryptonite.

Both Jor-El and Lara preserved some part of their "essence" (in the form of virtual copies of themselves) in the starship that took three years to bring their child to Earth. On Clark Kent's eighteenth birthday, a glowing crystal revealed itself in the ship and compelled Clark to take it north. He eventually reached the Arctic, where the crystal constructed the massive crystalline Fortress of Solitude. Inside, an artificially intelligent hologram of Jor-El appeared to him and initiated twelve years of Kryptonian education. These virtual versions of Jor-El and Lara remained as constructs within the Fortress throughout the series.

Superman's symbol was given a Kryptonian origin in the film. Male Kryptonians were shown wearing unique symbols on the chests of their robes, similar to a family crest; Jor-El and Kal-El wore the familiar S-shield, which Lois Lane later assumed to be the letter S from the familiar Latin alphabet, and thus dubs him "Superman".

Superman Returns
The 2006 film Superman Returns presents a version of Krypton almost identical to Superman. In the beginning of the film, scientists discover remains of Krypton, and Superman leaves Earth for five years to look for it. His ship is seen leaving the dead planet. The planet is destroyed when the red supergiant Rao becomes a supernova.

Superman Returns extends the crystalline Kryptonian technology from Superman which allowed young Clark Kent to "grow" the Fortress of Solitude. Kryptonian crystals are able to grow huge land masses and incorporate the properties of the surrounding environment; a sliver taken from one of the crystals used to test the theory causes Lex Luthor's basement to be filled with a huge crystal structure. Growing land in this manner causes widespread power failure. Lex Luthor later combines one of the crystals with kryptonite and shoots it into the ocean, creating a new land mass he calls "New Krypton". Superman uses his heat vision to get under the crust of the island and throws it into space, including the other crystals that Luthor wanted to use to set up a real estate scam, despite the warning that many people would die from the massive tsunamis and earthquakes that the crystals would create.

The novelization by Marv Wolfman states that one of Superman's ancestors helped civilize Krypton long ago.

DC Extended Universe
The DC Extended Universe'''s Krypton is introduced in the 2013 film Man of Steel and adds strong dystopian elements to Krypton and its fate. The planet is portrayed as having an Earth-like terrain composed of mountains, canyons and oceans. The planet is 8.7 billion years old and approximately 27.1 light years from Earth. Its parent star Rao is depicted as a 13 billion year old red dwarf sun. Its gravity is much higher than that of Earth, and its atmospheric composition is unsuitable for humans. It is also shown to have a natural satellite. Kryptonian society is divided into houses, such as the House of El. Citizens wear the crests of their house over their chests, which hold meanings, such as the crest of House of El meaning "hope".

Kryptonian civilization is at least 100,000 years old and many millennia more advanced than human civilization on Earth, and had begun exploring the Milky Way Galaxy. Kryptonians later abandon these projects in favor of isolationism and artificial population control, engineering newborns for pre-determined roles in society. The planet's resources were strained, and the stability of the planet was threatened by careless mining of the planet's core. As Jor-El attempts to warn the Science Council of their folly, General Zod stages a coup. In hopes of preserving the Kryptonian race, Jor-El steals the genetic Codex of the planet (a list holding the DNA pattern of everyone yet to be born on Krypton) and infuses it into the cells of Kal-El, the first natural-born child on Krypton in centuries, and sends his son to Earth. Zod kills Jor-El and is arrested by the authorities. He and his followers are banished to the Phantom Zone shortly before Krypton is destroyed.

In the 2016 film Batman v Superman: Dawn of Justice, Lex Luthor Jr. who in a deal with a Senator gained access to the crashed Scout Ship, managed to enter the ship using the fingerprints of General Zod. Using Zod's Command Key, he managed to access the Ship's mainframe. Luthor eventually overrides General Zod's authority over the ship, and learns how to use the Genesis Chamber. The Ship warned against what it would create, but Lex ordered it to proceed. Over the course of a couple of days, Zod's body began metamorphosing into a "Kryptonian Deformities", a crime among the Kryptonian Science Council.

Teen Titans Go! To the Movies
Krypton appears in the 2018 animated film Teen Titans Go! To the Movies. In the film, the Teen Titans travel to the planet and harmonized  its crystals with music, preventing its destruction and preventing Kal-El from arriving on Earth and becoming Superman, although they later returned to Krypton and undid their actions and allowed the planet to be destroyed.

Superman: Unbound
Brainiac's abduction of Kandor, despite the resistance posed by Krypton's military, is shown in Superman: Unbound. Brainiac is infamous for destroying the planet's he takes cities from, but he left Krypton intact. Jor-El correctly theorized that this was because Brainiac detected that the planet would soon explode anyway and decided not to bother wasting a missile on their sun. Jor-El and his brother Zor-El then sent their children to Earth on rockets while studying how to defeat Brainiac and convince their government of the danger to Krypton. At least some of the populace of Argo City also outlive their planet, but rather than preserving their city with an energy shield, they are abducted by Brainiac before the planet's destruction in response to Zor-El studying how to defeat the villain.

DC League of Super-Pets
In the 2022 animated film DC League of Super-Pets, the destruction of Krypton is depicted as the opening scene of the movie where Jor-El and Lara prepare to send Kal-El to Earth, but in this depiction, Kal-El's pet dog, Krypto, jumps into his carrier to accompany him. Jor-El reluctantly agrees to send him off in the hopes that his son will have a lifelong friend to be there for him.

Novelizations
Last Son of Krypton
The 1978 novel Last Son of Krypton by Elliot S! Maggin contains descriptions of Krypton, mainly referencing the Silver Age version; it describes the planet as a "failed star" with massive surface gravity and extremely hostile, glaciated conditions, which forced extreme adaptation and rapid evolution in the descendants of humanoid space travelers (and their pets, e.g., birds, cats, dogs, monkeys, etc.) who became stranded on its surface in prehistory. This led to an extremely strong, dense, and durable Kryptonian species with unusual physical properties. Maggin describes the rise of a civilization which uses geothermal heat as its primary power source, developing science and technology, but finding it difficult to escape the massive world's gravity. Eventually its internal nuclear reactions led to Krypton's explosion.

The Last Days of Krypton
Novelist Kevin J. Anderson presents approximately the last Earth year before Krypton's destruction in the 2007 novel The Last Days of Krypton''. Jor-El, Lara, Zod, and Zor-El are the primary point-of-view characters. Following Brainiac's abduction of Kandor, Zod attempts to seize power, eventually leading to a civil war. Here Jor-El manages to avert several disasters threatening Krypton before an attempt to destroy the Phantom Zone by several reactionary council members who Zod had previously imprisoned there destabilizes Krypton's core and destroys the planet. In addition to Kal-El's rocket and the forcefield surrounding Argo City, a third avenue for escaping the planet is represented by hordes of engineers who do believe Jor-El's warning and attempt to build several space arks to escape the planet. Tragically, they are unable to complete the ships fast enough. In the novel, Kryptonopolis is built over the ruins of Xan City.

See also
 Fictional planets
 Phaeton (hypothetical planet), whom British-born astronomer Michael Ovenden suggested be named "Krypton" after Superman's home world instead

References

External links
 Supermanica: Krypton Supermanica entry on the pre-Crisis Krypton.
 Superman Shield Evolution with picture

1938 in comics
1939 in comics
Fictional elements introduced in 1938
 
Fictional destroyed planets
DC Comics aliens
DC Comics dimensions
DC Comics planets
Fictional terrestrial planets
Fiction set in the Andromeda Galaxy
Superman